Vallo Reimaa (born 8 May 1961) is an Estonian politician of the Pro Patria and Res Publica Union. He was born in Kose, Harjumaa.

From April 2007 to January 2008 he was the Minister of Regional Affairs.

References

1961 births
Living people
People from Kose Parish
Isamaa politicians
Government ministers of Estonia
Academic staff of Tallinn University
Recipients of the Order of the White Star, 4th Class
21st-century Estonian politicians